David Eric England (born February 23, 1988) is an American film director, producer, and screenwriter. He is known for writing and directing the body horror film Contracted (2013), and later Get the Girl (2017) and Josie (2019). England also produced and co-wrote Greenlight (2019) with Patrick Robert Young and Graham Denman.

Filmography
Hostile Encounter (2010)
The Trick or Treater (2011)
Madison County (2011) 
Trick or Treater: Part II (2012) 
Roadside (2013)
Chilling Visions: 5 Senses of Fear (2013, Taste segment)  
Contracted (2013)
Get the Girl (2017)
Josie (2018)

References

External links
 
 Eric England on The Grave Plot Podcast

People from Pope County, Arkansas
People from Russellville, Arkansas
American film producers
Horror film directors
1988 births
Living people
Film directors from Arkansas